The 1903 Cleveland Naps season was the third Major League Baseball season for the Cleveland American League team.  After two seasons as the Bluebirds or Blues and also being called the Bronchos (or Broncos) in 1902, beginning with the 1903 season, the team was called the Naps in honor of star second baseman Nap Lajoie.  The team finished third in the league with a record of 77–63, 15 games behind the Boston Americans.

Offseason 
 February 1903: Ollie Pickering was purchased from the Naps by the Philadelphia Athletics.

Regular season

Season standings

Record vs. opponents

Roster

Player stats

Batting

Starters by position 
Note: Pos = Position; G = Games played; AB = At bats; H = Hits; Avg. = Batting average; HR = Home runs; RBI = Runs batted in

Other batters 
Note: G = Games played; AB = At bats; H = Hits; Avg. = Batting average; HR = Home runs; RBI = Runs batted in

Pitching

Starting pitchers 
Note: G = Games pitched; IP = Innings pitched; W = Wins; L = Losses; ERA = Earned run average; SO = Strikeouts

Other pitchers 
Note: G = Games pitched; IP = Innings pitched; W = Wins; L = Losses; ERA = Earned run average; SO = Strikeouts

Relief pitchers 
Note: G = Games pitched; W = Wins; L = Losses; SV = Saves; ERA = Earned run average; SO = Strikeouts

Notes

References 
1903 Cleveland Naps season at Baseball Reference

Cleveland Guardians seasons
Cleveland Naps season
1903 in sports in Ohio